Crip Hop is the fourth studio album by San Diego-based American rapper Jayo Felony. It was released on October 23, 2001 via American Music Corporation. The nineteen-track record was produced by DJ Battlecat, K-Def, Rick Rock, Soopafly, Ty Fyffe, Caviar, Chevvy, Flip Matrix, Ghetto Warden, Overdose, Sandlofer Music, and DJ Silk. Fellow rappers E-40, Spice 1, Baby Skar, Tiggi Diamonds, Young Crook, Young Nube, and Dulo Gang made guest appearances on the album. It was an improvement over his last album, Underground, making it to number 53 on the Top R&B/Hip-Hop Albums chart and number ten on the Top Independent Albums chart and featuring the hit single "She Loves Me".

Track listing

Notes
 †Song "Catch 'Em In The Morning" is a diss track towards Jay-Z, Beanie Sigel and Memphis Bleek 
 †Song "You's A Character" is a diss track towards Snoop Dogg and Kokane
Samples
 Track 7 contains samples from "Here I Come (Broader Than Broadway)" performed by Barrington Levy (1985)
 Track 13 contains samples from "Will You Cry (When You Hear This Song)" by Chic (1979)

Personnel 

 Chago Williams - backing vocals (track 17)
 Earl Stevens - guest artist (track 12)
 Floyd Wilcox - producer (track 19)
 James Savage - main artist
 Kannon Cross - producer (tracks: 7, 11-12)
 Kevin Gilliam - producer (track 5)
 Kevin Hansford - producer (track 6)
 Priest Joseph Brooks - guest artist & producer (track 9)
 Ricardo Thomas - producer (track 2)
 Robert Lee Green, Jr. - guest artist (track 2)
 Russell Brown - producer (tracks: 14, 16)
 Tikki Diamond - guest artist (track 4)
 Tyrone Gregory Fyffe - producer (tracks: 3, 13)
 William Moore - producer (tracks: 7, 11-12)
 Willy Sweetback - guitar (track 11)
 Baby Skar - guest artist (track 6)
 Chevvy - producer (track 15)
 Dulo Gang - guest artist (track 17)
 Ecay Uno - producer (track 17)
 Ghetto Warden - producer (track 18)
 Sandlofer Music - producer (track 4)
 Young Crook - guest artist (track 14)
 Young Nube - guest artist (track 19)

Charts

References

2001 albums
Jayo Felony albums
Albums produced by K-Def
Albums produced by Soopafly
Albums produced by Ty Fyffe
Albums produced by Rick Rock
Albums produced by Battlecat (producer)